Huang Shiping (Chinese: 黄世平; born 24 February 1963) is a male Chinese sports shooter. He won a bronze medal at 1984 Olympic Games in men's 50m running target. Four years later, Huang won a silver medal at 1988 Seoul Olympics in the same event.

References

1963 births
Living people
Chinese male sport shooters
Running target shooters
Olympic silver medalists for China
Olympic bronze medalists for China
Olympic medalists in shooting
Asian Games medalists in shooting
Shooters at the 1990 Asian Games
Medalists at the 1988 Summer Olympics
Medalists at the 1984 Summer Olympics
Asian Games gold medalists for China
Medalists at the 1990 Asian Games
People from Ningde
Sport shooters from Fujian
Shooters at the 1984 Summer Olympics
Shooters at the 1988 Summer Olympics
20th-century Chinese people